Solanum densevestitum, the felty nightshade, is a plant growing in the east coast areas of Australia. It grows north of Woolgoolga in eucalyptus forest, rainforest and woodland areas, usually near the coast.

An erect shrub, up to a metre tall. Leaves are 6 to 9 cm long, 3 to 5 cm wide, covered in soft hairs. Oval, elliptic or narrow-ovate in shape. Pale violet flowers occur throughout the year, but are most often seen in spring or autumn. The red berry is around 7 mm in diameter, mostly covered by the calyx lobes.

References

densevestitum
Solanales of Australia
Flora of New South Wales
Flora of Queensland
Taxa named by Ferdinand von Mueller
Taxa named by George Bentham